25th FFCC Awards
December 21, 2020

Best Picture:
First Cow

The 25th Florida Film Critics Circle Awards were held on December 21, 2020.

The nominations were announced on December 17, 2020, led by Nomadland and Minari with six nominations each.

Winners and nominees

Winners are listed at the top of each list in bold, while the runner-ups for each category are listed under them.

References

External links
 

2020 film awards
2020s